Emma Pendleton Bradley Hospital, known as Bradley Hospital, is the nation's first psychiatric hospital devoted exclusively to children and adolescents.

A Lifespan partner and teaching hospital for The Warren Alpert Medical School of Brown University, Bradley Hospital has established itself as the national center for training and research in child and adolescent psychiatry. It trains the next generation of behavioral health clinicians and investigates the causes of children’s mental health problems to develop effective therapies for improving their lives.

Bradley Hospital is a private, not-for-profit hospital. Its subsidiary, Lifespan School Solutions, is the parent corporation of the Bradley Schools and provides services to other programs as well. They provide special education oversight, clinical coordination, technical assistance and administrative support to the schools.

Areas of Expertise 
Beginning as young as six weeks old through adolescence, children and families at Bradley Hospital can receive treatment for a range of mental and behavioral health issues. The hospital treats more than 6,000 patients each year, and more than 700 children each day.

Bradley Hospital is a critical resource for families in Southern New England, as well as for those who travel from across the country and internationally. It offers a robust continuum of care inclusive of outpatient, intensive outpatient, in-home, partial-hospital, and acute inpatient treatment, as well as residential and special education services.

Areas of treatment include but are not limited to:

 Anxiety
 Attention Deficit Disorder
 Autism Spectrum Disorder
 Bipolar Disorder
 Communication and Sensory Processing Disorders
 Co-Occurring Disorders
 Depression
 Eating Disorders
 Feeding Disorders 
 Neuropsychology
 Obsessive Compulsive Disorder
 Risk Behaviors
 Trauma
 Psychosis
 Schizophrenia
 Self Harm
 Sleep Disorders
 Suicidality

History 
Bradley Hospital opened in 1931 as the first children’s psychiatric hospital in the United States. The hospital was named for George and Helen Bradley's only child, Emma Pendleton Bradley, who was diagnosed with encephalitis at the age of seven. The disease left her with multiple disabilities, including epilepsy, mental retardation and cerebral palsy. This tragedy sparked the Bradleys to conduct a worldwide search for a cure or a treatment for Emma's condition. Because psychiatry and neurology were in their infancy, hospitals were solely for adults and pediatric services were not yet available. The Bradleys arranged around-the-clock medical care for Emma at their summer home in Pomfret, Connecticut.

After eighteen years of treatment, Emma showed no improvement. George and Helen began to accept their daughter's fate, but wanted to ensure that other families would not share their family's struggle. In their wills, both George and Helen Bradley requested that the Baton House, the family's Providence estate, be converted into a treatment facility for children. The board of trustees decided that more space and a less urban setting were necessary for the institution, and so the beautiful home on Eaton Street was sold and 35 acres of wooded land was purchased on the Barrington Parkway. The ground was broken in 1929, and two years later the institution opened its doors.

See also
 List of hospitals in Rhode Island

References

External links
 Official Website

Hospitals in Rhode Island
Cerebral palsy organizations
Children's hospitals in the United States
Hospital buildings completed in 1929
Hospital buildings on the National Register of Historic Places in Rhode Island
National Register of Historic Places in Providence County, Rhode Island
Organizations based in Rhode Island
Psychiatric hospitals in Rhode Island